Madame Mystery is a 1926 American film starring Theda Bara, Oliver Hardy, and James Finlayson, directed by Richard Wallace and Stan Laurel, co-written by Laurel, and produced by Hal Roach. Footage from this film was reused in the Hal Roach two-reeler 45 Minutes From Hollywood (released December 26, 1926).

Cast
 Theda Bara as Madame Mysterieux
 Tyler Brooke as Hungry artist
 James Finlayson as Struggling author
 Oliver Hardy as Captain Schmaltz
 Fred Malatesta as Man of a thousand eyes
 Martha Sleeper
 Sammy Brooks
 Helen Gilmore
 William Gillespie

See also
 List of American films of 1926

References

External links

1926 films
1926 short films
American silent short films
American black-and-white films
Films directed by Richard Wallace
Films directed by Stan Laurel
Silent American comedy films
American comedy short films
1926 comedy films
1920s American films